Ramli bin Ngah Talib (born 16 March 1941) is a Malaysian politician who was active in the United Malays National Organisation. He served as the 8th Menteri Besar (Chief Minister) of Perak from 1982 to 1999 and was the Speaker of the Dewan Rakyat of the Malaysian Parliament from 2004 to 2008.

Early life and career
Born in the Malaysian rural heartland of Pasir Salak, Perak, he was raised in a kampong upbringing. Both his great grandfather Tok Anjang Pelita and great great grandfather Dato' Sagor, Dato Maharaja Lela and other Malay warriors were involved in the rebellion against British occupation in Malaya, resulting in the killing of the first British Resident of Perak, Mr. J. W. W. Birch on 2 November 1875.

With the essential qualification he was accepted to the school of his choice, furthering his studies at the Malay College, Kuala Kangsar. Successful, he pursued his studies in Law at Queens University, Belfast where he obtained an LL.B. (Hons) before obtaining his Barrister-at-Law degree at Lincoln’s Inn, London. In the 1960s whilst in the United Kingdom, he was active in the Students Union in Belfast of Northern Ireland, the political secretary and magazine editor of Kesatuan Melayu United Kingdom(United Kingdom Malay Students Association) based in London. On returning to Malaysia, he became a Law Lecturer at the Institute Technology Mara (now known as UITM) and a part-time lecturer at the University of Malaya in the early 70’s. In 1971 he became the first inhouse legal advisor of Lembaga Letrik Negara (now known as TNB) and at the same time he became qualified as an Advocate and Solicitor of the High Court of Malaya. He started practising law in Kadir, Tan & Ramli which he co-founded in 1977. Around this time he was appointed as a member of the Board of Directors of Utusan Melayu, a Malay mainstream media and a member of the Board of Directors of Lembaga Lektrik Negara (now Tenaga Nasional Bhd), the country's biggest power utility company.

Politics

Tan Sri Ramli was first elected as Perak State Assemblyman for his area Kg. Gajah Perak, in 1978, then appointed as a member of the State Executive Council, Perak. In the first year of the second term as State Assemblyman, he has reached the pinnacle of his chosen vocation by being appointed as the Menteri Besar (Chief Minister) of Perak and remained as one for more than 17 years, the longest serving Chief Minister of Perak. He became a Member of Malaysian Parliament in 2004 for the Pasir Salak constituency. During the first term as a Member of Parliament, he was appointed as head of the public custodian committee as Chairman of the Public Accounts Committee. In 2004 as a Member of Parliament, he was elected by the Dewan Rakyat (House of Representatives) as its Speaker.
On the literary front, when he was the Chief Minister of Perak, he wrote a book entitled ‘Pasir Salak: Sehamparan Sejarah Perjuangan’, a book about the Malay rebellion against British rule in Perak on 2 November 1875, and at the same time he also produced assortments of pamphlets and booklets on tourism for Pasir Salak and Perak. At the end of 2010, he completed a book written in Malay entitled ‘Meniti Zaman’ (Going Through Eras). Here he describes the beautiful, simple but tough rural life during and after the Japanese occupation. The people of his village endured a harsh rural life, right up to the time when he entered politics in the 1970s. His next acclaimed book, ‘Mr. Speaker, Sir; From Kampung Boy to the Helm of Parliament’ was published in 2012. In it he describes in vivid details the proceedings in Parliament in a manner not done before; the technicalities, the political posturings and the unanswered questions. He also contributed as a writer for the Commonwealth Parliamentary Association magazine.

The Pasir Salak Historical complex, consisting of 42 dioramas carved on wood depicting all the important events in the history of Malaysia and the Malays was built on his instructions in the early 1990s. It is the first of its kind and is certainly very instructive in this aspect of Malaysian history. His stress on bringing in more institutions of higher education to Perak saw him inviting ITM (now UITM-University Teknologi Mara ) to establish their first campus in Perak by giving shop houses belonging to the State Government free of rent. Some years later land was made avlaible in Sri Iskandar, Perak for UITM permanent campus. Among other more notable projects he helped to promote when he was the Chief Minister of Perak were the constructions of Proton City in Tanjung Malim, the Lumut Port, educational facilities like Universiti Sains Malaysia (later taken over by Petronas University), Universiti Pendidikan Sultan Idris, Tanjung Malim (UPSI), the development of Meru Raya at Ipoh, the Pasir Salak Historical Complex and the development of rural centers and the promotion of industrial centers including those in the rural areas. He however likes more to be remembered as having eradicated hardcore poverty in Perak in 1996.

His sporting activities varied from badminton, football, hiking, trekking, playing polo and flying ultra-light planes and small aircraft. He has a license to fly both types of aircraft which he had obtained in 2002. He is also the President of the Perak Aero Club and the President of Malaysia Chess Federation since 2007. He was President of Perak Football Association which saw Perak winning the first Malaysia cup. In 2007 while still a Speaker of Malaysian Parliament, he took time off to climb Malaysian Peninsula’s highest mountain, Gunung Tahan. Other areas where he partake, is mountain trekking in Norway, Bhutan and Nepal.

In 1986, he was awarded the title Dato' Seri Maharaja Lela Mangkubumi by a panel of Acheh’s customary chiefs for promoting good relations between Acheh and Perak. In 1996 he was awarded the Honorary Doctor of Laws LL.D. (Hon.) by the University of Sheffield, United Kingdom for promoting closer relation between Perak and Sheffield University and also for promoting cooperation in the joint establishment of the Perak Medical College in Ipoh with Sheffield University.

In politics, among other posts he was the Chairman of Perak UMNO Liaison Committee from 1984-2000 and a member of the UMNO Supreme Council from 1980-2006. In 2014 he was appointed as the Pro-Chancellor of the University of Malaya. He is also a permanent member of Dewan Negara Perak (Privy Council Perak) and a holder of the title Orang Kaya-Kaya Seri Agar Diraja (Dato’ Sagor), which he inherited from his great great grandfather Dato’ Sagor.

For his services he was awarded SPSA (Dato’ Seri DiRaja) by the Sultan of Perak and PSM (Tan Sri) by the Yang di-Pertuan Agong. He was also awarded the J.P (Justice of the Peace), the SPCM (Dato' Seri) by the Sultan of Perak and a holder of Paul Harris Fellowship.

Election results

Honours

Honours of Malaysia
  :
  Member of the Order of the Defender of the Realm (AMN) (1980)
  Commander of the Order of Loyalty to the Crown of Malaysia (PSM) – Tan Sri (1989)
  :
  Commander of the Order of Cura Si Manja Kini (PCM) (1982)
  Grand Knight of the Order of Cura Si Manja Kini (SPCM) – Dato' Seri (1984)
Justice of the Peace (JP) (1986)
  Ordinary Class of the Perak Family Order of Sultan Azlan Shah (SPSA) – Dato' Seri DiRaja (2000)

References

Chief Ministers of Perak
Living people
Malaysian Muslims
Malaysian people of Malay descent
Speakers of the Dewan Rakyat
1941 births
United Malays National Organisation politicians
People from Perak
Members of the Dewan Rakyat
Members of the Perak State Legislative Assembly
Perak state executive councillors
Commanders of the Order of Loyalty to the Crown of Malaysia
Members of the Order of the Defender of the Realm